Anarsia crassipalpella is a moth of the family Gelechiidae. It was described by Henry Legrand in 1966. It is found on Aldabra in the Seychelles.

References

crassipalpella
Moths described in 1966
Moths of Africa